Gugan (also Romanized as Gūgān and Gāvgān; also known as Gāvkān) is a city in Gugan District of Azarshahr County, East Azerbaijan province, Iran. At the 2006 census, its population was 10,949 in 3,109 households. The following census in 2011 counted 11,395 people in 3,564 households. The latest census in 2016 showed a population of 11,742 people in 3,892 households.

References 

Azarshahr County

Cities in East Azerbaijan Province

Populated places in East Azerbaijan Province

Populated places in Azarshahr County